The Lucky International Open was a PGA Tour event in the 1960s in San Francisco, California. It was played at Harding Park Golf Club, a public course across Lake Merced from the more glamorous Olympic Club. One of the founders and sponsors of the Lucky International Open was Eugene Selvage, owner of the Lucky Lager Brewing Company.

Following surgery on his hands the previous summer, San Francisco native Ken Venturi won his 14th and final PGA Tour event here in January 1966, taking the first prize of $8,500 with his parents in the gallery. The deteriorating conditions and antiquated facilities at Harding Park caused the PGA Tour to leave at the end of the decade.

The final edition in 1969 was played in late October without the Lucky name and had a winner's share of $20,000. Steve Spray gained his only tour victory, one stroke ahead of runner-up Chi-Chi Rodríguez, the playoff winner in January 1964.

For its first six years, it was played in late January, the week after the Bing Crosby National Pro-Am at Pebble Beach. Not played in 1967, it was held in mid-autumn in 1968 and 1969.

Of the eight winners, six were major champions; five already and George Archer (1965) won his at the 1969 Masters.

Winners

References

Former PGA Tour events
Golf in California
Sports in the San Francisco Bay Area
Recurring sporting events established in 1961
Recurring sporting events disestablished in 1969
1961 establishments in California
1969 disestablishments in California